Your Church in Brisbane City (also known as Ann Street Church of Christ) is a church  at 430 Ann Street in the  Brisbane central business district, Queensland, Australia. It is affiliated with the Churches of Christ in Australia and holds public worship services each Sunday morning.

Its website lists its aim as "Connecting Christians and Changing Lives" with importance placed on worshipping Jesus and welcoming everyone.

History 
The Church of Christ congregation was formed on 23 September 1883 when a handful of idealistic Christians gathered in Brisbane to found a new church. The founders were linked by their support of Australian evangelist Stephen Cheek. Cheek died in early 1883 before the church began. The church was a leading congregation within Churches of Christ in Australia with roots in the Restoration Movement. Throughout its history it has been known as "Disciples of Christ",  "Ann Street Church of Christ" and "Your Church in Brisbane City".

The church building was built in 1881 for the United Methodist Free Church. When it was offered for sale in 1898, the church's minister William and his wife Martha Clapham led the church to purchase it for £1,100 in September 1898.

The church was active in starting other Brisbane churches. In 1912, it held an outreach to Hawthorne and established a Sunday school that in 1914 became the Hawthorne Church of Christ. The Sunday school secretary of the Ann Street church in the early 1920s was Australian army chaplain John Kenneth Martin.

Famous Members 
 Digby Denham, Premier of Queensland 1911-1915, was a leading member in the late 1800s and early 1900s. He was Premier from 1911-1915 and helped establish the University of Queensland and the Queensland Ambulence Service. 
 Alexander Russell Main (1877-1945), Theologian, the church's minister from 1900-1903
 Allen Brooke (1899-1968), Chaplain-General, was the church's minister in 1939. He left the ministry to serve as a chaplain on the front lines of World War II. He went on to become Chaplain-General of the Australian forces. He was awarded the Commander of the Order of the British Empire.

References

External links
 Official Website
 430 Ann Street on Facebook

Churches in Brisbane
Churches of Christ
19th-century Protestant churches
Churches completed in 1881
1881 establishments in Australia
Ann Street, Brisbane
Methodist churches in Queensland